Figure 8 racing is a form of stock car racing in which automobiles race on a track that purposely intersects itself, increasing the risk of collisions. Figure 8 racing is most common and popular in the United States and Canada. Because of the risk of collisions, figure 8 racing bears some similarity to the chiefly European sport of banger racing.

Track
Racing is done on a track shaped like an 8. The cars cross paths at the center of the 8, which is known as the "crossover" or the "X". Because of this layout, crashes are common. Figure 8 racing is a unique form of motorsport that requires strict attention to detail and timing to successfully navigate the crossover. In Canada, figure 8 racing often takes place as a part of demolition derby events. Two obstacles, often concrete blocks or vehicles are placed in the demolition derby ring to form a figure 8 track.

History
Figure 8 track racing began right after World War II, in the late 1940s. The track may have had an overpass so that the cars did not cross each other's paths. Most historians believe that the first track where drivers crossed paths was the 1/5 mile-long Indianapolis Speedrome.  The sport received nationwide publicity when it was frequently televised on ABC's Wide World of Sports in the 1960s, usually from Islip Speedway in Islip, New York.

Vehicle

The cars used are often stock cars, but are usually modified for lightness and safety, by removing the window glass and often adding a roll cage.   A wing much like a sprint car is sometimes placed on the roof to increase downforce. The cars' bodies are typically made out of sheet metal.  All manner of vehicles have been used.  School buses have become popular, especially at county fairs, because of their extended exposure for crashes.

World championship
The oldest operating figure 8 track in the United States is the Indianapolis Speedrome in Indianapolis. The track has been in operation since the 1940s. It hosts the annual World Figure 8 race, which is considered the world championship event. The first three-hour  endurance race was held in 1977.

United States championship
The national championship in the United States is held at Riverhead Raceway in Riverhead, New York.

Notable figure 8 tracks
Many of these tracks have configurations that allow for both standard oval and figure 8 races.

Altamont Raceway Park (closed in 2008)
Anderson Speedway, Anderson, Indiana
Arizona State Fairgrounds, Phoenix, Arizona (yearly Grandstand event during the fair) 
Ascot Park in Gardena, CA (Closed)
Beech Bend Raceway Park Bowling Green, KY (Oval/Figure 8 Closed)
Columbus Motor Speedway (Closed)
Colorado National Speedway
Evergreen Speedway
Empire Expo Center
Flat Rock Speedway 
Holland Speedway (added 2012)
Indianapolis Speedrome
Irwindale Speedway
Islip Speedway Islip, NY ( closed in 1984)
Lake Erie Speedway
Little Valley Speedway (closed in 2017)
Manzanita Speedway (Closed in 2009)
Oxford Plains Speedway Oxford Plains, ME
Painesville Speedway  Painesville, OH
Raceway Park (Minnesota), Shakopee, MN (Closed in 2013)
Riverhead Raceway
Riverside Park Speedway Agawam, Mass (closed in 1999)
Rockford Speedway
Seekonk Speedway
Slinger Super Speedway
Sportsdrome Speedway, Jeffersonville, IN (added 2017)
Toledo Speedway
Wisconsin International Raceway

Media

References

External links

National Organization of Figure Eight Automobile Racing web site, accessed August 2006
NEFigure8n.com, Nebraska Figure 8 Racing Association, accessed September 2011

Auto racing by type
Articles containing video clips